Emma Woods (born December 18, 1995) is a Canadian ice hockey forward, currently playing in the Premier Hockey Federation (PHF) with the Toronto Six.

Playing career 
Growing up in Burford, Ontario, Woods played with the boys' Burford Coyotes until the bantam level, often the only girl on the team. In 2011, Woods was recognised with the Phyllis Gretzky Memorial Award for Female Youth Leadership from the Brantford Sports Council.

Woods played four seasons of NCAA Division I ice hockey with the Quinnipiac Bobcats women's ice hockey program of Quinnipiac University in the ECAC Hockey conference. As a sophomore, she was named to the ECAC All-Academic team and, as a junior, she served as an alternate captain and was named to the All-ECAC Third Team. She served as team captain during her senior season.

Professional
In 2016, she was drafted in the fourth round, 14th overall by the Buffalo Beauts of the NWHL. In the 2017 CWHL Draft, she was selected in the seventh round, 49th overall by the Vanke Rays, one of two new Canadian Women's Hockey League (CWHL) expansion teams in China. Woods opted to sign with the Vanke Rays for the 2017–18 CWHL season. She remained with the franchise as it merged with the other CWHL team in China, Kunlun Red Star, to become the Shenzhen KRS Vanke Rays for the 2018–19 CWHL season.

In the 2019–20 season, Woods played with Leksands IF of the Swedish Women's Hockey League (SDHL). She tallied 29 points in 35 games – tied with fellow-Canadian Brooke Boquist for second-most on the team.

In June 2020, it was announced that Woods had joined the NWHL expansion team, the Toronto Six, making her the seventh player to sign with the organization. The Toronto Six roster included four teammates from Woods'  time with the Qunnipiac Bobcats – Kelly Babstock, Sarah-Ève Coutu-Godbout, Shiann Darkangelo, and Emma Greco – in addition to Vanke Rays teammate Elaine Chuli and Leksands IF teammate Brooke Boquist.

The leadership for the inaugural season included Woods, who served as one of the alternate captains with Emma Greco, while Shiann Darkangelo appointed as the first team captain in franchise history. Collobrating with Shiann Darkangelo, they would assist on the first goal scored in Toronto Six franchise history. Scored by Lindsay Eastwood, the goal took place in the second game of the 2020–21 NWHL season, scored against Minnesota Whitecaps goaltender Amanda Leveille .

Personal life 
Woods was born December 18, 1995, in London, Ontario. She grew up in Burford, Ontario, with her older sister, Rebecca, twin brother Calvin, and younger brother, Hayden.

She attended Paris District High School for her secondary education, where she participated in varsity ice hockey, volleyball, junior basketball, soccer, tennis, track and field, badminton, and baseball. During her high school career, she won county-level championships in badminton, tennis, and baseball, won the regional championship in tennis, and competed at the provincial-level for ice hockey and tennis. Woods was three-time MVP of the ice hockey team and twice served as team captain. She was named the Paris District Senior Female Athlete of the Year in 2013.

Career statistics

Regular season and playoffs 

Sources:

Awards and honors

Sources:

References

Notes

External links
 

1995 births
Living people
Sportspeople from the County of Brant
Canadian women's ice hockey forwards
Toronto Six players
Leksands IF players
Shenzhen KRS Vanke Rays players
Vanke Rays players
Quinnipiac Bobcats women's ice hockey players
Canadian expatriate ice hockey players in Sweden
Canadian expatriate ice hockey players in the United States
Canadian twins